Elysia ornata, commonly known as ornate elysia or ornate leaf slug, is a species of sea slug, a marine gastropod mollusk. This sea slug superficially resembles a nudibranch, yet it does not belong to that suborder of gastropods. Instead it is a member of the closely related clade Sacoglossa, the "sap-sucking" sea slugs.

Description
It is a translucent greenish-yellow colour speckled with white and black. It has broad parapodia each edged with an orange band and a black margin. The rhinophores are similarly coloured with a band of orange and dark tips. Its main food source is algae and are found on submergent vegetation.

Distribution
Elysia ornata is a tropical species found in both the Pacific Ocean and the Caribbean Sea.

References

External links
Elysia ornata – WoRMs
Elysia ornata (Pease, 1871) – seaslugs.free.fr
Elysia ornata – Sous les Mers

Plakobranchidae
Gastropods described in 1840